Henri Rang (8 June 1902 in Timișoara – 25 December 1946 in Iași) was a Romanian horse rider who competed in the 1936 Summer Olympics. In 1936 he and his horse Delfis won the silver medal in the individual jumping competition.

He died in a motorcycle accident on Christmas Day 1946, riding his Zündapp sidecar, a gift from Adolf Hitler following his Olympics performance.

References

External links
 
 

1902 births
1946 deaths
Sportspeople from Timișoara
Romanian male equestrians
Show jumping riders
Olympic equestrians of Romania
Equestrians at the 1936 Summer Olympics
Olympic silver medalists for Romania
Olympic medalists in equestrian
Medalists at the 1936 Summer Olympics
Road incident deaths in Romania